Tân Sơn may refer to:

Tân Sơn District, Vietnam
Tân Sơn, Bac Giang, Vietnam
Tân Sơn, Bac Kan, Vietnam
Tân Sơn, Ninh Thuận, Vietnam

See also

Tonson (surname)